Stowaway is a 1932 American pre-Code romance film directed by Phil Whitman, written by Norman Springer, and starring Fay Wray, Leon Ames, Montagu Love, Lee Moran, and Roscoe Karns. It was released on March 1, 1932, by Universal Pictures.

Plot summary

Cast 
 Fay Wray as Mary Foster
 Leon Ames as Tommy
 Montagu Love as Groder 
 Lee Moran as Mackie
 Roscoe Karns as Insp. Redding
 Knute Erickson as Capt. Grant
 Paul Porcasi as Tony
 Betty Francisco as Madge

References

External links 
 
 
 
 

1932 films
1930s romance films
American black-and-white films
American romance films
Films set on ships
Universal Pictures films
Films directed by Phil Whitman
1930s English-language films
1930s American films